The 1905 Boston Americans season was the fifth season for the professional baseball franchise that later became known as the Boston Red Sox. The Americans finished fourth in the American League (AL) with a record of 78 wins and 74 losses, 16 games behind the Philadelphia Athletics. The team was managed by Jimmy Collins and played its home games at Huntington Avenue Grounds.

Offseason 
 December 26, 1904: George Stone and cash were traded by the Americans to the St. Louis Browns for Jesse Burkett.
 March 1905: The team held spring training in Macon, Georgia.

Regular season 
 April 14: The regular season opens with a 3–2 loss to the Philadelphia Athletics at Columbia Park in Philadelphia.
 April 21: In the home opener, the Americans lose to the visiting Athletics, 5–4.
 July 4: In their longest game of the season, the Americans lose to the Athletics, 4–2 in 20 innings, in the second game of a doubleheader played in Boston.
 August 5: The team has a winning record for the first time in the season, reaching 44–43 with an 8–4 win over the Cleveland Naps at League Park in Cleveland.
 September 27: Bill Dinneen throws a no-hitter in a home game against the Chicago White Sox.
 October 7: The regular season ends with a home doubleheader against the New York Highlanders; Boston wins both games, 7–6 in 10 innings, then 12–9 in five innings.

Statistical leaders
The offense was led by Jimmy Collins with 65 RBIs and a .276 batting average, and Hobe Ferris with six home runs. The pitching staff was led by Cy Young, who made 38 appearances (33 starts) and pitched 31 complete games with an 18–19 record and 1.82 ERA, while striking out 210 in  innings; and Jesse Tannehill, with 37 appearances (32 starts) and 27 complete games with a 22–9 record and 2.48 ERA, with 113 strikeouts in  innings.

Season standings 

The team had one game end in a tie; June 22 vs. Chicago White Sox. Tie games are not counted in league standings, but player statistics during tie games are counted.

Record vs. opponents

Opening Day lineup 

Source:

Roster

Player stats

Batting 
Note: Pos = Position; G = Games played; AB = At bats; H = Hits; Avg. = Batting average; HR = Home runs; RBI = Runs batted in

Starters by position

Other batters 
Note: G = Games played; AB = At bats; H = Hits; Avg. = Batting average; HR = Home runs; RBI = Runs batted in

Pitching 
Note: G = Games pitched; IP = Innings pitched; W = Wins; L = Losses; ERA = Earned run average; SO = Strikeouts

Starting pitchers

Other pitchers 
Note: G = Games pitched; IP = Innings pitched; W = Wins; L = Losses; ERA = Earned run average; SO = Strikeouts

References

External links 
1905 Boston Americans at Baseball Reference
1905 Boston Americans season at Baseball Almanac

Boston Red Sox seasons
Boston Americans
Boston Americans
1900s in Boston